Anna Carlsson (born August 24, 1973) is a German voice actress from Frankfurt am Main. She voices in the German-language dubs of a number of animation and anime productions including Kim Possible. The Little Mermaid, Lilo & Stitch: The Series, Cardcaptor Sakura, Dr. Slump and Dragon Ball. In live-action dubbing she voiced in Desperate Housewives, Angel and Samantha Who?.  She is the dub voice for Eva Longoria, Piper Perabo, Zooey Deschanel, and Amy Smart on a number of films and shows. She is fluent in the languages of German, English and Swedish.

Filmography

Film

Television

Other Media

In the German version of the Computer Game Jagged Alliance (1995) she voiced one of the main supporting characters, Brenda Richards.

References

External links
 Official agency profile at Marina Schramm Sprecher Management 
 Official agency profile at Kuhl Management 
 
 
 Anna Carlsson at Deutsche Synchronkartei dubbing database 

1973 births
German voice actresses
Living people
Actors from Frankfurt